The Colombia national roller hockey team is the national team side of Colombia at international roller hockey. Usually it is part of FIRS Roller Hockey World Cup and CSP Copa América.

References

External links
Chile Roller Sports Federation

National Roller Hockey Team
Roller hockey
National roller hockey (quad) teams